The National Security Archive is a 501(c)(3) non-governmental, non-profit research and archival institution located on the campus of the George Washington University in Washington, D.C. Founded in 1985 to check rising government secrecy. The National Security Archive is an investigative journalism center, open government advocate, international affairs research institute, and the largest repository of declassified U.S. documents outside the federal government. The National Security Archive has spurred the declassification of more than 10 million pages of government documents by being the leading non-profit user of the U.S. Freedom of Information Act (FOIA), filing a total of more than 50,000 FOIA and declassification requests in its over 30 years of history.

Organization history and accolades

Led by founder Scott Armstrong, former Washington Post Reporter and staff on the Senate Watergate Committee, journalists and historians came together to create the National Security Archive in 1985 with the idea of enriching research and public debate about national security policy. The National Security Archive continues to challenge national security secrecy by advocating for open government, utilizing the FOIA to compel the release of previously secret government documents, and analyzing and publishing its collections for the public.

As a prolific FOIA requester, the National Security Archive has obtained a host of seminal government documents, including: the most requested still image photograph at the U.S. National Archives – a December 21, 1970 picture of President Richard Nixon's meeting with Elvis Presley; the CIA's "Family Jewels" list that documents decades of the agency's illegal activities; the National Security Agency's (NSA) description of its watch list of 1,600 Americans that included notable Americans such as civil rights leader Martin Luther King Jr., boxer Muhammad Ali, and politicians Frank Church and Howard Baker; the first official CIA confirmation of Area 51; U.S. plans for a "full nuclear response" in the event the President was ever attacked or disappeared; FBI transcripts of 25 interviews with Saddam Hussein after his capture by U.S. troops in December 2003; the Osama bin Laden File, and the most comprehensive document collections available on the Cold War, including the nuclear flashpoints occurring during the Cuban Missile Crisis and the 1983 "Able Archer" War Scare.

In 1998, the National Security Archive shared the George Foster Peabody Award for the outstanding broadcast series, CNN's Cold War. In 1999, the National Security Archive won the George Polk Award, for "facilitating thousands of searches for journalists and scholars. The archive, funded by foundations as well as income from its own publications, has become a one-stop institution for declassifying and retrieving important documents, suing to preserve such government data as presidential e-mail messages, pressing for appropriate reclassification of files, and sponsoring research that has unearthed major revelations." In September 2005, the Archive won the Emmy Award for outstanding achievement in news and documentary research. In 2005, Forbes Best of the Web stated that the Archives is  "singlehandedly keeping bureaucrats’ feet to the fire on the Freedom of Information Act." In 2007, the Archive was named one of the ""Top 300 web sites for Political Science," by the International Political Science Association. In February 2011, the National Security Archive won Tufts University's Dr. Jean Mayer Global Citizenship Award for "demystifying and exposing the underworld of global diplomacy and supporting the public's right to know." Journalismdegree.org includes Freedominfo.org on its list of Best Sites for Journalists in 2012. From 2003–2014 the Archive has received 54 citations from the University of Wisconsin's Internet Scout Report recognizing "the most valuable and authoritative resources online."

Funding
The National Security Archive relies on publication revenues, grants from individuals and grants from foundations such as the Carnegie Corporation of New York, the Ford Foundation, the William and Flora Hewlett Foundation, the John S. and James L. Knight Foundation, the John D. and Catherine T. MacArthur Foundation, and the Open Society Foundations, for its $3 million yearly budget. The National Security Archive receives no government funding. Incorporated as an independent Washington, D.C. non-profit organization, the National Security Archive is recognized by the Internal Revenue Service as a tax-exempt public charity.

Program areas

The National Security Archive operates eight program areas, each with dedicated funding. The National Security Archive's (1) open government and accountability program receives support from the Open Society Foundations.  The Archive's (2) international freedom of information program in priority countries abroad and in the Open Government Partnership has been supported by the William and Flora Hewlett Foundation.  The Archive's (3) human rights evidence program, providing documentation for use by truth commissions and prosecutions, received funding from the John D. and Catherine T. MacArthur Foundation.  The Archive's (4) Latin America program, with projects on Mexico, Chile, Cuba and other countries, is supported by the Ford Foundation, the Reynolds Foundation, and the Coyote Foundation.  The Archive's (5) nuclear weapons and intelligence documentation program is supported by the Prospect Hill Foundation, the New-Land Foundation, and the Carnegie Corporation of New York, which also funds the Archive's (6) Russia/former Soviet Union program. The National Security Archive has a Russian-language page for their Russian programs. The Archive's (7) Iran program is supported by the Arca Foundation and through a partnership with MIT Center for International Studies. The Archive's (8) publications program, creating public access to declassified documents both online and in book formats, relies on publication royalties from libraries that subscribe to the Digital National Security Archive through the commercial publisher ProQuest.

Publications

The National Security Archive publishes its document collections in a variety of ways, including on its website, its blog Unredacted, documentary films, formal truth commission and court proceedings, and through the Digital National Security Archive, which contains over 50 digitized collections of more than 94,000 meticulously indexed documents, including the newly-available 'Targeting Iraq, Part I: Planning, Invasion, and Occupation, 1997–2004' and 'Cuba and the U.S.: The Declassified History of Negotiations to Normalize Relations, 1959–2016,' published through ProQuest.

National Security Archive staff and fellows have authored over 70 books, including the winners of the 1996 Pulitzer Prize, the 1995 National Book Award, the 1996 Lionel Gelber Prize, the 1996 American Library Association's James Madison Award Citation, a Boston Globe Notable Book selection for 1999, a Los Angeles Times Best Book of 2003, and the 2010 Henry Adams Prize for outstanding major publication on the federal government's history from the Society for History in the Federal Government.

The National Security Archive regularly publishes Electronic Briefing Books  of newsworthy documents on major topics in international affairs on the Archive's website, which attracts more than 2 million visitors each year who download more than 13.3 gigabytes per day. There are currently over 500 briefing books available.

The National Security Archive also frequently posts about declassification and news on its blog, Unredacted.

Lawsuits

The National Security Archive has participated in over 50 Freedom of Information lawsuits against the U.S. government. The suits have forced the declassification of documents ranging from the Kennedy-Khrushchev letters during the Cuban Missile Crisis to the previously censored photographs of homecoming ceremonies  with flag-draped caskets for U.S. casualties of the wars in Iraq and Afghanistan.

In April 2017 the National Security Archive, with the Knight First Amendment Institute at Columbia University and Citizens for Responsibility and Ethics in Washington (CREW), filed a FOIA lawsuit against the Department of Homeland Security for the release of the White House visitor logs in the federal District Court for the Southern District of New York on April 14, 2017. In 2017 the Archive was also a co-plaintiff with CREW in a federal suit against President Donald Trump for alleged violations of the Presidential Records Act.

The National Security Archive has also settled two seminal lawsuits regarding the preservation of White House emails. The original White House e-mail lawsuit against presidents Ronald Reagan, George H. W. Bush, and Bill Clinton found that e-mail had to be treated as government records, consequently leading to the preservation of more than 30 million White House e-mail messages from the 1980s and 1990s. The second White House e-mail lawsuit, filed in 2007 and settled in 2009, sought the recovery and preservation of more than 5 million White House e-mail messages that were deleted from White House computers between March 2003 and October 2005.

As of October 2018, the National Security Archive and Citizens for Responsibility and Ethics in Washington have a pending case in the United States District Court for the District of Columbia against the Donald J. Trump administration's use of messaging applications that can delete conversations or records of conversations which goes against the Presidential Records Act. The suit, Citizens for Responsibility and Ethics in Washington et al. v. Trump et al.,  was filed on June 22, 2017. In March 2017, U.S. District Court Judge Christopher R. Cooper ruled that the act gives the president a "substantial degree of discretion" in deciding what should be preserved as a permanent records and it allows the president to destroy records that no longer have "administrative, historical, informational or evidentiary value." The case is currently under appeal.

Audits

Since 2002, the Archive has carried out annual FOIA audits that are designed after the California Sunshine Survey. These FOIA audits evaluate whether government agencies are in compliance with open-government laws. The surveys include:

 The Ashcroft Memo: "Drastic" Change or "More Thunder Than Lightning"? 
 Justice Delayed is Justice Denied 
 A FOIA Request Celebrates Its 17th Birthday: A Report on Federal Agency FOIA Backlog 
 Pseudo-Secrets: A Freedom of Information Audit of the U.S. Government's Policies on Sensitive Unclassified Information 
 File Not Found: 10 Years After E-FOIA, Most Federal Agencies are Delinquent 
 40 Years of FOIA, 20 Years of Delay 
 Mixed Signals, Mixed Results: How President Bush's Executive Order on FOIA Failed to Deliver 
 2010 Knight Open Government Survey: Sunshine and Shadows 
 2011 Knight Open Government Survey: Glass Half Full 
 2011 Knight Open Government Survey: Eight Federal Agencies Have FOIA Requests a Decade Old 
 Outdated Agency Regs Undermine Freedom of Information.
 Half of Federal Agencies Still Use Outdated Freedom of Information Regulations 
 Most Agencies Falling Short on Mandate for Online Records 
 Saving Government Email an Open Question with December 2016 Deadline Looming

Rosemary Award

Every year the National Security Archive nominates a government agency for the Rosemary Award for worst open government performance. The award is named after President Nixon's secretary, Rose Mary Woods, who erased  minutes of a crucial Watergate tape. Past "winners" include the Department of Justice, the Federal Chief Information Officer's Council, the FBI, the Department of the Treasury, the Air Force, Director of National Intelligence James Clapper, the Secret Service, the White House and the CIA.

Conferences 

The Archive has organized, sponsored, or co-sponsored a dozen major conferences. These include the historic conferences held in Havana in 2002 and in Budapest in 1996 respectively. For the Havana conference, which took place during the 40th anniversary of the Cuban Missile Crisis, Cuban president Fidel Castro and former US secretary of defense Robert McNamara discussed newly declassified documents showing that US president John F. Kennedy, in meetings with Soviet leader Nikita Khrushchev's son-in-law Adzhubei in January 1962, compared the US failure at the Bay of Pigs to the Soviet invasion of Hungary in 1956. The Budapest conference of 1996, carried out by the Archive's "Openness in Russia and East Europe Project" in collaboration with Cold War International History Project and Russian and Eastern European partners, focused on the 1956 uprising was a featured subject at an international conference which the Archive, CWIHP, and the Zentrum für Zeithistorische Forschung organized in Potsdam on "The Crisis Year 1953 and the Cold War in Europe." Oxford University historian Timothy Garton Ash called the conference "not ordinary at all.... this dramatic confrontation of documents and memories, of written and oral history...."

Other noteworthy conferences the National Security Archive took part in include a conference held in Hanoi in 1997, during which Defense Secretary Robert McNamara met with his Vietnamese counterpart, Gen. Võ Nguyên Giáp, and a series of conferences on U.S.-Iranian relations.

In December 2016 the Archive, with the Carnegie Corporation, the Nuclear Threat Initiative, and the Carnegie Endowment, hosted a conference on the 25th anniversary of the Nunn-Lugar nuclear threat reduction legislation, which helped secure post-Soviet nuclear weapons. The conference, attended by Senators Sam Nunn and Richard Lugar as well as other Nunn-Lugar veterans including Russians, Kazakhs, and Americans, was held in the Kennedy Caucus Room of the U.S. Senate and discussed the future of mutual security and U.S.-Russian relations.

Board

Based at George Washington University's Gelman Library, the Archive operates under an advisory board that is directed by the Archive's Executive Director, Thomas S. Blanton, and is overseen by a board of directors.

 Board of Directors

 Chair: Sheila S. Coronel (Director, Stabile Center for Investigative Journalism, Graduate School of Journalism, Columbia University; former Director, Philippine Center for Investigative Journalism)
 Vice Chair: Nancy E. Soderberg (Distinguished Visiting Scholar, Department of Political Science and Public Administration, University of Northern Florida; former Vice President, International Crisis Group; former U.S. Alternate Representative to the United Nations; former Deputy Assistant to the President for National Security Affairs; former Staff Director, National Security Council; appointed Chair of the Public Interest Declassification Board in January 2012) 
 Secretary: Edgar N. James, Esq. (Partner, James & Hoffman; pro bono litigator on behalf of the Archive) 
 Treasurer: Nancy Kranich (Former Associate Dean of Libraries, New York University; Former President, American Library Association)
 Michael Abramowitz (President, Freedom House; former Director, National Institute for Holocaust Education of the United States Holocaust Memorial Museum; former White House Correspondent and National Editor of The Washington Post)
 Vivian Schiller (Chief Digital Officer, NBC News; former President, National Public Radio; former Senior Vice President, The New York Times Company; former Senior Vice President, The Discovery Times Channel)
 Cliff Sloan (Partner, Skadden, Arps, Slate, Meagher & Flom LLP; Special Envoy for Guantanamo Closure, United States Department of State, 2013–2014; General Counsel of Washington Post. Newsweek Interactive, 2000–2008)
 President: Thomas S. Blanton (Director, National Security Archive)

 Advisory Board

 Dr. Philip Brenner, Ph.D. (Professor of International Relations and former Chair, School of International Service, American University; Lead plaintiff in Archive lawsuit for Cuban Missile Crisis documents) 
 Susan Brynteson (University Librarian, University of Delaware; Former Chair, American Library Association Intellectual Freedom Committee) 
 Dr. Anne Cahn, Ph.D. (Member of the Board of Directors, United States Institute of Peace; Author of Killing Détente; former Director, Committee on National Security; former Arms Control and Disarmament Agency and Department of Defense staffer)
 Rosemary Chalk (National Research Council, National Academy of Sciences) 
 John Dinges (Professor, Columbia University School of Journalism; former Managing Editor, National Public Radio; Archive Fellow and Author of Our Man in Panama)
 Herbert N. Foerstel (Retired University Librarian, University of Maryland; Author of Secret Science and Surveillance in the Stacks; Member, American Library Association Intellectual Freedom Committee)
 Dr. Joan Hoff, Ph.D. (Professor of History and Chair of the Baker Institute, Ohio University; former Executive Secretary, Organization of American Historians) 
 Dr. Akira Iriye, Ph.D. (Professor of History, Harvard University; Past President, American Historical Association) 
 Dr. David Alan Rosenberg, Ph.D. (Professor of Maritime Strategy, National War College; Former MacArthur Fellow) 
 Tina Rosenberg, (New York Times Editorial Board; Former MacArthur Fellow; Former Archive Fellow and Pulitzer Prize winner for her book The Haunted Land) 
 Jack Siggins (University Librarian, The George Washington University) 
 Thomas Susman, Esq. (Partner, Ropes & Gray; Former counsel, U.S. Senate Judiciary Committee; Co-author of the 1974 Freedom of Information Act amendments)

See also 

 CIA Library
 Freedom of the Press Foundation
 Library of National Intelligence
 National Security Agency academic publications
 WikiLeaks

References

External links
 National Security Archive
 NSA Director Tom Blanton speaks on "Secrecy in the United States: Priorities for the Next President", Rappaport Center for Law and Public Service, Suffolk University Law School, October 12, 2008
 C-SPAN Q&A interview with Tom Blanton, December 23, 2007
Presidential Records at the U.S. National Archives
Complaint, Docket 1 (PDF), No. 1:17-cv-01228, D.D.C., Jun 22, 2017

1985 establishments in Washington, D.C.
501(c)(3) organizations
Archives in the United States
Freedom of information in the United States
George Washington University
United States government information
History of the foreign relations of the United States
Non-profit organizations based in Washington, D.C.
Organizations established in 1985
United States government secrecy
United States national security policy